Rashid Sabir [(Sindhi: رشيد صابر), 10 January 1945 – 7 December 2012)] was a Pakistani film, TV, radio and stage artist. He wrote 300 dramas for Radio Pakistan and dialogues for 12 Sindhi language films. He also acted in a number of TV serials and plays.

Childhood and career 
Rashid Sabir was born on 10 January 1945 at village Manko (Sindhi: مڻڪو), Taluka Jati, District Thatta (Now District Sujawal) Sindh, Pakistan. His real name was Abdul Rasheed. His father's name was Abdullah Mendhro. He passed examination of Moulvi Fazil and got B.A. degree from University of Sindh Jamshoro. He started his career as a teacher at Noor Muhammad High School Hyderabad and retired in 1986.

Contributions 

Rashid Sabir began his literary activities by wiring short stories. His first story was published in famous Sindhi language literary magazine Badal in 1962. Then he translated stories of the renowned writer Amar Jaleel in Urdu. He wrote first Radio play "Manzil" which was recorded and produced by Syed Manzoor Naqvi from Radio Pakistan Hyderabad. Overall, he wrote about 300 plays both in Sindhi and Urdu for Radio Pakistan Hyderabad.  He hosted a religious Program on Radio Pakistan Hyderabad for about 05 years.

He was a famous dialogue writer. In this capacity, he wrote dialogues for 12 Sindhi Pakistani films including "Phul Macchi",  "Toofan", "Ghatoo Ghar Na Aaya", "Tay Qaidi", "Ho Jamalo", "Barsat" and "Aakhiri Goli".

As an actor, he was introduced on Pakistan Television (PTV) Centre Karachi in 1975. His first PTV play, in which he participated as an actor, was "Oondahia Men Laat" produced by Bedal Masroor. He also acted in "Marvi", "Kanhin Kanhin Manhooa Manjh" and other Sindhi and Urdu dramas and serials. He also acted in various serials of private channels of Pakistan. As a writer, he wrote more than 35 plays and serials for Pakistan Television.

He was a great educationist, expert in Arabic and poet. He authored following books:
 Tareekh-e-Islam (History of Islam) 
 Jadeed Arabi Grammar (Modern Arabic Grammar)

In poetry, his pen name was "Sabir". This pen name for him was suggested by the renowned writer and scholar Moulana Ghulam Muhammad Girami.

In recognition of his contributions, he received "Writers Award" in 2001 and 2002 from Radio Pakistan Hyderabad.

Death 
Rashid Sabir died on 7 December 2012 in Karachi. He left behind a widow, three sons and five daughters.

References 

1945 births
2012 deaths
Writers from Sindh
Pakistani writers
Sindhi people
Sindhi-language writers